Rughanuiyeh (also Romanized as Rūghanū’īyeh and Rowghanū’īyeh; also known as Rowghanū Bālā, Rowghanū-ye Bālā, and Rūghanū’īyeh-ye Bālā) is a village in Mahan Rural District, Mahan District, Kerman County, Kerman Province, Iran. At the 2006 census, its population was 17, in 6 families.

References 

Populated places in Kerman County